Nucleoplasmin, the first identified molecular chaperone is a thermostable acidic protein with a pentameric structure. The protein was first isolated from Xenopus species

Functions
The pentameric protein participates in various significant cellular activities like sperm chromatin remodeling, nucleosome assembly, genome stability, ribosome biogenesis, DNA duplication and transcriptional regulation. During the assembly of regular nucleosomal arrays, these nucleoplasmins transfer the DNA to them by binding to the histones. This reaction requires ATP.

Human proteins
Humans express three members of the nucleoplasmin family:
Nucleophosmin (NPM1)
Nucleoplasmin 2 (NPM2)
Nucleoplasmin 3 (NPM3)

References

Further reading 

 
 

Molecular chaperones